The Nire—Fourmilewater GAA is a Gaelic Athletic Association club based in Ballymacarbry, County Waterford in Ireland. The Nire (An Uidhir) and Fourmilewater (Caislean Cuanach) are two separate clubs, with separate committees pulling from the same pool of players. The Nire is the Gaelic football club in the area and Fourmilewater the hurling club. Both teams play in the Mill Field, Ballymacarbry. The Nire is a half parish with Touraneena, while Fourmilewater is a half parish with Newcastle, County Tipperary. The Nire play in yellow and blue, while Fourmilewater play in blue and white. The related Ballymacarby Ladies' Gaelic football club has won 10 All-Ireland Ladies' Club Football Championship titles.

History

The Nire and Fourmilewater are two separate clubs, with separate committees pulling from the same pool of players. The Nire is a half parish with Touraneena, while Fourmilewater is a half parish with Newcastle, County Tipperary. Both teams play in the Mill Field, Ballymacarbry. 

The Nire, which was founded in 1929, is the football club in the area and Fourmilewater, founded in 1926, is the hurling club. The local Ladies Gaelic football club was founded in 1970 and named Ballymacarbry.

Football
Founded in 1929, The Nire gained promotion to the Senior ranks when they won the Waterford Intermediate Football Championship in 1983. They have been senior ever since, in that time they have gone on to win 10 Waterford Senior Football Championship.

At U-21 (A) level, The Nire have been county champions on three occasions, in 1977, 1986 and 2004. In 2004, they defeated Ballinacourty 0-9 to 0-8 in the Western Final and went on to beat Portlaw–St Molleran's in the county final.

At minor (A) level (U-18), The Nire won their 3rd A title in 2014, having defeated Stradbally by 3-11 to 0-6 on 14 May 2014. The Nire had previously won 2 minor county championships, the first in 2007 where they defeated De La Salle in the final and the second in 2008 where they recorded a victory over Roanmore.

Honours
The Nire's football honours include:
Waterford Senior Football Championships (11): 1993, 1994, 1997, 2000, 2006, 2008, 2014 2016, 2018, 2021, 2022
 Waterford Intermediate Football Championships (2): 1971, 1983
 Waterford Junior Football Championships (1): 1942
 Waterford Under-21 Football Championships (3): 1977, 1986, 2004
 Waterford Minor Football Championships (3): 2007, 2008, 2014

Notable footballers
 Darren Guiry
 Dylan Guiry - Waterford footballer
 Thomas O'Gorman - Waterford footballer
 Maurice O'Gorman - Waterford footballer and Munster interpro regular
 James McGrath - Waterford footballer
 Michael O'Gorman
 Brian Wall - former Waterford footballer

Hurling

Honours
Fourmilewater Hurling Club have been senior since 2002. They beat Dunhill in the 2001 Waterford Intermediate Hurling Championship final. Fourmilewater's hurling titles include:

 Waterford Intermediate Hurling Championships (3): 1979, 1989, 2001
 Waterford Junior Hurling Championships (2):  1955, 1963
 Waterford Minor hurling Championships (1): 1973

Notable hurlers
 Jamie Barron - Waterford hurler
 Conor Gleeson - Waterford hurler who, together with Jamie Barron, represented Waterford at senior hurling during the 2010s and played in the 2020 All-Ireland Senior Hurling Championship Final.
 Liam Lawlor - Waterford hurler
 Michael Ryan
 Shane Walsh

Ladies Gaelic football
Founded in 1970, Ballymacarbry LGFC are one of the most successful ladies' club teams of all time. The club had several successes in the 1980s and 1990s under the stewardship of Michael Ryan. The County title has been won every year since 1982 and as of 2022 they had won 41 in a row, a significant record. They have also won a record ten All Ireland club titles and the Waterford ladies' team that captured 5 All Irelands in the 1990s were predominantly made up of Ballymacarbry players. Players such as Marie Crotty, Geraldine O'Ryan, Áine Wall, Fiona Crotty are considered amongst the best to ever play the game.

Notable LGFC players
 Áine Wall

References

Gaelic games clubs in County Waterford
Hurling clubs in County Waterford
Gaelic football clubs in County Waterford